Prosser Creek is a perennial stream in Nevada County, California, formed from the North Fork Prosser Creek and South Fork Prosser Creek, then flowing into Prosser Creek Reservoir, and then to the Truckee River.

References

Rivers of Nevada County, California